Acacia abbreviata is a shrub belonging to the genus Acacia and the subgenus Juliflorae. It is endemic to arid parts of northern Australia

Description
The generally smooth pale grey-brown coloured bark is minutely fissured. The angular yellow to red-brown branchlets have small resinous hairs and obscure ridges. The linear green phyllodes occur in groups of six at the nodes. It blooms between April and October producing cylindrical flower-spikes with a length of  packed with golden coloured flowers. The flat and sub-woody seed pods that form after flowering have a linear-oblanceolate shape that tapers toward the base. The seeds inside are arranged obliquely to longitudinally.

Taxonomy
The species was first formally described by the botanist Bruce Maslin in 1980 as part of the work Acacia (Leguminosae-Mimosoideae): A contribution to the flora of central Australia as published in the Journal of the Adelaide Botanic Gardens. It was reclassified as Racosperma abbreviatum by Leslie Pedley in 2003 then transferred back to genus Acacia in 2006.
The type specimen was collected in the Tanami desert by J.R.Maconochie in 1970.

Distribution
The shrub is found in a small area of the Tanami Desert in the Northern Territory close to the Western Australian border. It is usually situated on stony lateritic ridges and plains where it grows in shallow clay loamy soils as a part of spinifex communities.

See also
List of Acacia species

References

abbreviata
Plants described in 1980
Flora of the Northern Territory
Taxa named by Bruce Maslin